The 8th Mirchi Music Awards, presented by the Radio Mirchi, honoured the best of Hindi music from the year 2015. The ceremony was held on 29 February 2016 at the Yash Raj Studios, Mumbai and was hosted by Sonu Nigam. There were many performances, including those by Mika Singh, Yo Yo Honey Singh, Amaal Mallik, Palak Muchhal and Badshah. Bajirao Mastani won a leading seven awards including Album of the Year. Song of the Year went to "Gerua" from Dilwale. The show was broadcast on 13 March 2016 on Zee TV.

Winners and nominees 

The winners were selected by the members of jury, chaired by Javed Akhtar. The following are the names of nominees and winners.

(Winners are listed first, highlighted in boldface.)

Film awards

Technical awards

Non-film awards

Special awards

Listeners' Choice awards

Jury awards

Films with multiple wins and nominations

 Won a Listeners' Choice  award

Jury 
The jury was chaired by Javed Akhtar. Other members were:

 Alka Yagnik - playback singer
 Milind Srivastava - music director
 Anu Malik - music director
 Anuradha Paudwal - playback singer
 Bappi Lahiri - composer, singer
 Hariharan - singer
 Ila Arun - actress and folk singer
 Irshad Kamil - lyricist
 Lalit Pandit - composer
 Kavita Krishnamurthy - playback singer
 Louis Banks - composer, record producer and singer
 Madhur Bhandarkar - director, writer and producer
 Pankaj Udhas - singer
 Prasoon Joshi - lyricist and screenwriter
 Pritam - music director and composer
 Ramesh Sippy - director and producer
 Roop Kumar Rathod - playback singer and music director
 Sadhana Sargam - playback singer
 Sulemaan - composer
 Sameer - lyricist
 Sapna Mukherjee - playback singer
 Shaan - playback singer
 Shailendra Singh - playback singer
 Shankar Mahadevan - composer and playback singer
 Subhash Ghai - director, producer and screenwriter
 Sudhir Mishra - director and screenwriter
 Suresh Wadkar - playback singer
 Talat Aziz - singer
 Udit Narayan - playback singer
 Vijay Krishna Acharya - director and screenwriter

See also 
 Mirchi Music Awards

References

External links 
 Music Mirchi Awards Official Website
 Music Mirchi Awards 2015

Mirchi Music Awards